Curve XXIV is an outdoor 1981 weathering steel sculpture by Ellsworth Kelly, installed at Olympic Sculpture Park in Seattle, Washington. The pieces measures 6 feet, 4 inches by 19 feet by 4 inches. It is one of several fan-shaped sculptures by Kelly.

See also

 1981 in art

References

1981 sculptures
Olympic Sculpture Park
Steel sculptures in Washington (state)
Weathering steel